Xu Binshi (12 March 1931 – 15 February 2023) was a Chinese engineer specializing in equipment maintenance surface engineering, and an academician of the Chinese Academy of Engineering.

Biography
Xu was born in Harbin, Heilongjiang, on 12 March 1931, while his ancestral home is in Zhaoyuan County (now Zhaoyuan), Shandong. In 1947, he was admitted to Harbin Institute of Technology, where he majored in mechanical manufacturing and welding. After graduating in 1954, he was despatched to Harbin Military Academy of Engineering (now National University of Defense Technology), where he developed the first vibration arc surfacing equipment of China. He moved to the PLA Armored Corps Engineering Academy in 1961. He attained the rank of major general (shaojiang) in June 1990.

Xu died on 15 February 2023, at the age of 91.

Honours and awards
 1995 Member of the Chinese Academy of Engineering (CAE)
 Foreign Academician of the Polish Academy of Sciences (PAN)

References

1931 births
2023 deaths
People from Harbin
Engineers from Heilongjiang
Harbin Institute of Technology alumni
Academic staff of the National University of Defense Technology
Members of the Chinese Academy of Engineering
20th-century Chinese engineers
21st-century Chinese engineers
People's Liberation Army generals from Heilongjiang